This is a list of Sinhalese people by their country of domicile or origin. All communities that speak Sinhalese or spoke Sinhalese and originally came from Sri Lanka are included. Sinhalese are the majority ethnic group in Sri Lanka.

Academics

Professor Rohan Abeyaratne
 Gladys Jayawardene
Professor Rohan Gunaratna
Professor Sir Nicholas Attygalle
Professor Nirmal Ranjith Dewasiri
Professor Kapila Gunasekara
Professor K. N. Jayatilleke
Professor Sam Karunaratne
Professor W.S. Karunaratne
Professor G. L. Peiris
Professor Walpola Rahula
Professor V. K. Samaranayake
Professor Ajith Kumar Siriwardena

Activists
Ajith C. S. Perera
Shantha Bandara

Actors and actresses

Joe Abeywickrama
Jackson Anthony
Gamini Fonseka
Malini Fonseka
Shanudrie Priyasad
Tony Jayawardena
Henry Jayasena
Vijaya Kumaratunga
Tony Ranasinghe
Ravindra Randeniya
Iranganie Serasinghe
 Pooja Umashankar
Yashoda Wimaladharma

Archaeologists and anthropologists
S. U. Deraniyagala
Senarat Paranavithana
Ellawala Medhananda Thero

Architects and Civil Engineers

 Minnette De Silva
 Oliver Weerasinghe
 U. N. Gunasekera
 A. N. S. Kulasinghe

Authors
W. A. Silva
Martin Wickramasinghe
Karunasena Jayalath
Lionel de Fonseka

Aviators
J.P. Obeyesekere III
Monath Perera
Ray Wijewardene

Broadcasters
Karunaratne Abeysekera
Vernon Corea
Vijaya Corea
Owen de Abrew
A.W. Dharmapala
Eric Fernando
Prosper Fernando
H.M. Gunasekera
Thevis Guruge
Shirley Perera
Seelaratne Senarath
Livy Wijemanne

Buddhist monks

 Balangoda Ananda Maitreya Thero
 Gangodawila Soma Thero
 Hikkaduwe Sri Sumangala Thera
 Kadawedduwe Jinavamsa Mahathera
 Katukurunde Nanananda Thera
 Kiribathgoda Gnanananda Thero
 Kithalagama Sri Seelalankara Thera
 Madihe Pannaseeha Thero
 Mapalagama Wipulasara Maha Thera
 Matara Sri Nanarama Mahathera
 Matara Sri Nanarama Mahathera
 Migettuwatte Gunananda Thera
 Narada Maha Thera
 Päläne Vajirañāna Thero
 Piyadassi Maha Thera
 Polwatte Buddhadatta Thera
 Ratmalane Sri Dharmaloka Thera
 Rerukane Chandawimala Thero
 Thibbatuwawe Sri Siddhartha Sumangala Thero
 Thotagamuwe Sri Rahula Thera
 Udugama Sri Buddharakkitha Thero
 Weligama Sri Sumangala Thero
 Weliwita Sri Saranankara Thero
 Weweldeniye Medhalankara Thero

Civil servants
Hamilton Shirley Amerasinghe
Bradman Weerakoon
Sanath Weerakoon

Clergy

Cyril Abeynaike, 10th bishop of Colombo (Anglican)
Tissa Balasuriya (Catholic)
Cardinal Thomas Cooray, 8th archbishop of Colombo 
Ivan Corea (Anglican)
Duleep de Chickera, 14th bishop of Colombo (Anglican)
Lakdasa De Mel, 1st bishop of Kurunegala (Anglican)
Lynn de Silva (Methodist)
Harold de Soysa, 9th bishop of Colombo (Anglican)
Frank Marcus Fernando, 3rd bishop of the Roman Catholic Diocese of Chilaw
Nicholas Marcus Fernando (1932-2020), Roman Catholic Archbishop of Colombo from 1977 to 2002
Kenneth Fernando, 13th bishop of Colombo (Anglican)
Swithin Fernando, 11th bishop of Colombo (Anglican)
Oswald Gomis, 10th archbishop of Roman Catholic Archdiocese of Colombo
Kumara Illangasinghe, 4th bishop of Kurunegala (Anglican)
Marcelline Jayakody (Catholic)
Andrew Kumarage, 3rd bishop of Colombo (Anglican)
Valence Mendis, current bishop of the Roman Catholic Diocese of Chilaw
Edmund Peiris (1897-1989), Bishop of Chilaw from 1940 to 1972, President of the Royal Asiatic Society of Sri Lanka from 1959 to 1961
Elmo Noel Joseph Perera, 5th bishop of the Roman Catholic Diocese of Galle
Aloysius Pieris, Jesuit Catholic priest
Ernest Poruthota (1931-2020), Roman Catholic priest and author
Cardinal Malcolm Ranjith, current archbishop of Colombo (Catholic)
Lakshman Wickremasinghe, 2nd bishop of Kurunegala (Anglican)

Composers and conductors
Rohan Joseph de Saram
Dilup Gabadamudalige
Rohana Weerasinghe

Corporate leaders

Dilith Jayaweera

Diplomats

 Jayantha Dhanapala
 Neville Kanakeratne
 Vernon Mendis
 Bernard Tilakaratna

Economists
 Gamani Corea
 N. U. Jayawardena
 W. D. Lakshman

Fashion
Otara Gunewardene
Ruchira Silva

Filmmakers 
 Dharmasiri Bandaranayake
 Andrew Jayamanne
 Vasantha Obeysekera
 Dharmasena Pathiraja
 Lester James Peries
 Sumitra Peries
 Titus Thotawatte
 Prasanna Vithanage

Freedom agitators and martyrs
Puran Appu
Gongalegoda Banda
Ven. Anagarika Dharmapala
Gratien Fernando
Captain D.E. Henry Pedris
Sir James Peiris
Keerthi Vijayabahu

Industrialists

Sir Ernest de Silva
Sir Charles Henry de Soysa
Andiris Perera Dharmagunawardhana
Daya Gamage
U.N. Gunasekera
Don Carolis Hewavitharana
Harry Jayawardena
Dhammika Perera
Phillip Upali Wijewardena

Journalists 
Ernest Corea
Seelaratne Senarath

Judges 
Hon. Justice A.W.H. Abeyesundere
Hon. Justice Andrew Ranjan Perera
Hon. Justice Christopher Gregory Weeramantry

Military personnel

Air Force
Marshal of the air force Roshan Goonatilake
Air Chief Marshal Harry Goonatilake
Air Chief Marshal Paddy Mendis
Air Chief Marshal G. Donald Perera
Air Chief Marshal Jayalath Weerakkody
Air Vice Marshal E. R. Amarasekara
Air Commodore Shirantha Goonatilake

Army
Field Marshal Sarath Fonseka
General D. S. Attygalle
General G. H. De Silva
General Denis Perera
General Nalin Seneviratne
General T. I. Weerathunga
Lieutenant General Jagath Jayasuriya
Lieutenant General Denzil Kobbekaduwa
Lieutenant General Parami Kulatunga
Lieutenant General Shavendra Silva
Major General Janaka Perera
Major General Vijaya Wimalaratne
Colonel Fredrick C. de Saram
Lieutenant Colonel Lalith Jayasinghe
Captain Saliya Upul Aladeniya
Second Lieutenant K. W. T. Nissanka
Warrant Officer 2nd Class H.B. Pasan Gunasekera
Corporal Gamini Kularatne

Navy
Admiral of the fleet Wasantha Karannagoda
Admiral Clancy Fernando
Admiral D.B. Goonesekara
Vice Admiral Asoka de Silva
Rear Admiral Rohan Amarasinghe
Rear Admiral Royce de Mel
Rear Admiral Mohan Jayamaha

Monarchs and royalty

King Vijaya Sinhala
King Paduvasdew 
King Pandukabhaya 
King Devanampiyatissa
King Dutugemunu
King Gajabahu I
King Parâkramabâhu I
King Vijaya
King Vikkamabahu
King Vimala Dharma Surya I
Queen Anula
Queen Lilavati
Rani Padmini

Musicians and singers

W. D. Amaradeva
Sujatha Aththanayaka
Bathiya and Santhush
Victor Rathnayake
Sunil Shantha
Ananda Samarakoon
Sunil Perera
Yohani De Silva
Iraj Weeraratne
DeLon
Sunil Edirisinghe
Shihan Mihiranga Bennet
Ajith Bandara
Lakshman Joseph de Saram
C. T. Fernando
M. S. Fernando
Rookantha Gunathilake
Edward Jayakody
Eddie Jayamanne
T. M. Jayaratne
Nalin Jayawardena
H. R. Jothipala
Gunadasa Kapuge
Kamal Addararachchi
Premasiri Khemadasa
Vijaya Kumaranatunga
Ranidu Lankage
Annesley Malewana
Milton Mallawarachchi
Nimal Mendis
Sanath Nandasiri
Nihal Nelson
Keerthi Pasquel
Stanley Peiris
Lionel Ranwala
Freddie Silva
Priya Suriyasena
Dharmadasa Walpola
Latha Walpola
Clarence Wijewardena
Nissanka Wimalasuriya

Painters
 Solias Mendis
 David Paynter

Philosophers
Nalin de Silva
K. N. Jayatilleke
David Kalupahana

Policemen
Cyril Dissanayake
T.B. Kehelgamuwa

Politicians

Lalith Athulathmudali
Anura Bandaranaike
Felix Dias Bandaranaike
Sirimavo Bandaranaike
Solomon Bandaranaike
Dr Colvin R de Silva
William de Silva
Gamini Dissanayake
Amarasiri Dodangoda
Vivienne Goonewardena
Monty Gopallawa
William Gopallawa
C.V. Gunaratne
Dinesh Gunawardena
Tyronne Fernando
Sirisena Hettige
I. M. R. A. Iriyagolla
Junius Richard Jayewardene
C.W.W. Kannangara
Sir John Kotelawala
Karunasena Kodituwakku
Chandrika Kumaratunga
Cyril Mathew
Anil Moonesinghe
Jude Perera
N.M. Perera
Ranasinghe Premadasa
Mahinda Rajapaksa
Mahinda Samarasinghe
Mangala Samaraweera
Don Stephen Senanayake
Dudley Senanayake
Maithripala Senanayake
Rosy Senanayake
Maithripala Sirisena
I. J. Wickrema
Ratnasiri Wickremanayake
Doreen Wickremasinghe
Ranil Wickremesinghe
Ranjan Wijeratne
Dingiri Banda Wijetunge
Ranil Jayawardena
Rohana Wijeweera

Scientists
Professor Chandre Dharma-wardana
Dr Sarath Gunapala
Professor Mohan Munasinghe
Dr Cyril Ponnamperuma
Professor Chandra Wickramasinghe
Malik Peiris
Charith Mendis

Sportspeople

Racing
Ananda Wedisinghe
Dilantha Malagamuwa

Athletics
Sriyantha Dissanayake
Damayanthi Dharsha
Susanthika Jayasinghe
Dinesh Priyantha
Himasha Eashan
Pradeep Sanjaya
Dulan Kodithuwakku
Yupun Abeykoon

Cricket
 Marvan Atapattu
 Aravinda de Silva
 Martin de Silva
 Gamini Goonesena
 Churchill Gunasekara
 Asanka Gurusinha
 Douglas Dias Jayasinha
 Sanath Jayasuriya
 Mahela Jayawardene
 Ranjan Madugalle
 Lasith Malinga
 Roshan Mahanama
 Arjuna Ranatunga
 Kumar Sangakkara
 Chaminda Vaas
 Bandula Warnapura

Swimming
 Matthew Abeysinghe
 Kyle Abeysinghe
 Cherantha de Silva

Technologists

Chamath Palihapitiya

Trade unionists 
Siritunga Jayasuriya
I. J. Wickrema

Writers
Shehan Karunatilaka
Gunadasa Amarasekara
Sugathapala de Silva
Brendon Gooneratne
Regi Siriwardena

References

See also
 List of Sri Lankans
 Sinhalese people

S

Sinhalese